Ukraina Lviv (full name: Sports Society Ukraina Lviv) was a Galician and then Polish association football team of the ST Ukraina (Sports Society), located in the city of Lviv. 

At that time the ST Ukraina was a sports society of ethnic Ukrainians in Poland and Austria-Hungary, earlier. The football team existed in 1911–14, 1921–39 and 1942–44. The club was liquidated twice by the Soviet regime.

History
The club was founded in 1911 based on the Ukrainian Sports Club (USK, existed since 1904) on initiative of professor Ivan Bobersky who had previously been a teacher of physical education in a Ukrainian junior high school in Przemyśl. During first three years of existence, Ukraina played mostly with other ethnic Ukrainian sides from Galicia, and in 1914, with outbreak of World War I, the club ceased its activities.

Ukraina returned in 1921 and in 1928 it became a member of the Polish Football Association. The team played in Lwow A-Class, which was equivalent of today's second level of football games (see: Lower Level Football Leagues in Interwar Poland). In the 1930s, Ukraina was one of the strongest football teams in southeastern Poland, its top player, Oleksandr Skotsen' after World War II went to France and played for OGC Nice (see: List of foreign Ligue 1 players). Altogether, Ukraina played twelve seasons in the Lwow A-Class, three times placing on the second position (1937, 1938 and 1939). Overall, Ukraina got 199 points in 182 games (with two points for a victory and one for a tie), with goal difference 433:351.

Ukraina played its last known game on August 27, 1939. On that day, using field of the friendly side of Pogoń Lwów, the Ukrainians beat the team of Kazimierz Gorski, Worker's Lwow 4–0.

Ukraina Lwow also had an ice-hockey department, which in February 1938 became a sensational vicechampion of the Lwow region.

After the World War II in 1944 the ST Ukraine was dissolved by the Soviet authorities. Former members reestablished the society in Montreal, Canada.

See also 
Toronto Ukrainians
Karpaty Lviv
Ukraine (sports society)

References

External links 
Scans of Przeglad Sportowy magazine, with results of Ukraina's games

Association football clubs established in 1911
Association football clubs disestablished in 1939
Lwów District Football League
Football clubs in Lviv
Football in Austria-Hungary
1911 establishments in Austria-Hungary
1939 disestablishments in Ukraine

Defunct football clubs in former Polish territories
Ukrainian association football clubs outside Ukraine
Polish football clubs in Lviv